Fairmount is a neighborhood of Louisville, Kentucky located along Bardstown Road (US 31E) and Fairmount Road.

References

Neighborhoods in Louisville, Kentucky